Fly The Flag may refer to

Fly The Flag, British Airways ad campaign and promotional song and single
Fly the Flag (album), Down By Law album
Fly the Flags, Stiff Little Fingers album
"Fly the Flag", song by Epicure from Fold (album)
"Fly the Flag", song by Stiff Little Fingers from Nobody's Heroes (album)
"Fly the Flag", song by B'z from The Circle (B'z album)
"Fly the Flag", song by Fallout (band)	1982